is an electric utility, servicing 7.6 million individual and corporate customers in six prefectures in Tōhoku region plus Niigata Prefecture. It provides electricity at 100 V, 50 Hz, though some area use 60 Hz.

Tohoku Electric Power is the fourth-largest electric utility in Japan in terms of revenue, behind TEPCO, KEPCO and Chubu Electric Power.

Shareholders 
 Nippon Life Insurance Company 3.9%
 Japan Trustee Services Bank 3.8%
 The Master Trust Bank of Japan 3.6%

Accidents 
On 11 March 2011, several nuclear reactors in Japan were badly damaged by the 2011 Tōhoku earthquake and tsunami.
In the Onagawa Nuclear Power Plant a fire broke out in the turbine section of the plant.

In order to make up for the loss of electricity from the damaged reactor plant, Tohoku announced it would restart a mothballed natural gas power plant.  The liquefied natural gas and oil-fired No. 1 unit at the Higashi Niigata plant in Niigata prefecture has a 350-megawatt capacity and could be in operation by early June 2011.

See also 
 Energy in Japan
 Nuclear power in Japan

References 

 Tohoku Electric Power Annual Report 2010
 Tohoku Electric Power Financial Report (FY2010)

External links 
  Tohoku Electric Power

Electric power companies of Japan
Nuclear power companies of Japan
Companies based in Sendai
Energy companies established in 1955
Non-renewable resource companies established in 1955
Companies listed on the Tokyo Stock Exchange
Companies listed on the Osaka Exchange
Japanese companies established in 1955